Ready Steady Cook is a four-time Logie Award-nominated Australian cookery competition show that aired on Network Ten from 2005 until 2013. Repeats continued to air daily until early 2014. It is based on the original Ready Steady Cook series broadcast by the BBC. The format is owned by Endemol.

The show debuted in 2005, where it was hosted by former chef Nick Stratford. It aired weekdays at 1:00pm. Former Nine Network personality Peter Everett took over the hosting job in January 2006 to coincide with Ten's new daytime lineup. From 2006, it has aired at 2:00pm.

In March 2011, it was announced that Colin Lane replaced Everett from June 2011.

Overview
Two teams (Capsicum and Tomato), consisting each of a professional chef and an audience member compete against each other, both trying to create the best entrée, meal and dessert in a 20-minute time limit. The final segment sees both opposing chefs teaming up to prepare a dish in a strict time limit.

New challenges were introduced in 2009. As well as the regular gourmet and classic bags, the chefs are given surprise new challenges that push their cooking skills to the limit.

Chefs featured on the show

 Andy Ball
 Janelle Bloom
 Chris Cranswick-Smith
 Shane Delia
 Manu Feildel
 Matt Golinski
 Jacqui Gowan
 Damian Heads
 Mark Jensen
 Tom Kime
 Miguel Maestre
 Alastair McLeod
 Nicholas Owen
 Brett Panter
 Tobie Puttock
 George Calombaris
 Adrian Richardson
 Dominique Rizzo
 Jason Roberts
 Carol Selva Rajah
 Darren Simpson
 Adam Swanson
 Anthony Telford
 Yuey Then

Celebrity guests
A celebrity version of Ready Steady Cook Australia aired separate to the daytime series during prime time for a brief period in 2005. The following celebrities have appeared at least once, though others have also been seen on the show, both during the regular series and prime time celebrity shows.

2005

 Natalie Bassingthwaighte
 Tim Brunero
 Anthony Callea
 Ryan 'Fitzy' Fitzgerald
 John Foreman
 Andrew G
 Mike Goldman
 Marcia Hines
 Craig Lowndes
 Ryan Moloney
 James Mathison
 Leah McLeod
 Monique Mueller
 Steven Richards
 Kyle Sandilands

2008
In 2008, there were a number of 'celebrity cook-offs' on the daytime show. The celebrity cook-offs were randomly put into the schedule throughout 2008. Some of the celebrities that appeared in 2008 are:

 Faustina 'Fuzzy' Agolley (host from Video Hits)
 Christine Anu
 Natarsha Belling
 Billy Bentley (Big Brother 2007 housemate)
 Tahir Bilgic
 Aleisha Cowcher (Big Brother 2007 winner)
 John Dee (Planet Ark Founder)
 Wes Denning
 Anh Do
 Bianca Dye (first 'celebrity cook-off')
 Peter Everitt
 Bobby Flynn
 Nic Fosdike
 Adam Harvey 
 Vijay Khurana
 Jade MacRae
 Brad McEwan
 Erin McNaught
 Nathan Sapsford (host from Video Hits)
 Sandra Sully
 Peter Timbs (Big Brother 2001 housemate)
 Zoran Vidinovski (Big Brother 2007 housemate)
 Kim Watkins
 Ron Wilson
 Tiffani Wood
 Bill Woods

2009
The celebrity cook-offs return for the 2009 series. Participants include:

 Performers Gina Riley and Craig McLachlan
 Country music stars Beccy Cole and Gina Jeffreys
 Newsreaders Ron Wilson and Kathryn Robinson
 Newsreaders Angela Bishop and Belinda Heggen
 Newsreader Brad McEwan and retired netball player Liz Ellis
 Bondi Vets Dr. Chris Brown and Dr. Lisa Chimes.
 Bondi Rescue lifeguard Tom Bunting and pro-bodyboarder Alex Bunting,
 Farmer Dave Graham,
 Singers Grace Knight and Paulini.
 So You Think You Can Dance Australia judge Bonnie Lythgoe and choreographer Jason Gilkinson.
 NRL players Ben Ross and Luke Grant.
 The Biggest Loser season three contestants Sam Rouen and Sean Holbrook.
 Good News Week team captain Claire Hooper and Talkin' 'Bout Your Generation comedian Josh Thomas.
 Radio personalities Jonathon "Jono" Coleman and Ian "Dano" Rogerson.
 Socceroos players Simon Colosimo and Danny Vukovic.
 Country singer, Melinda Schneider and singer/songwriter Mark Gable
 Australian Idol performers, Luke Dickens and Teale Jakubenko
 Ita Buttrose
 Father Chris Riley – Youth Off The Streets

Awards

|-
! scope="row" | 2009
| Logie Awards of 2009
| rowspan="4" | Most Popular Lifestyle Program
| rowspan="4" | Ready Steady Cook
| 
| 
|-
! scope="row" | 2010
| Logie Awards of 2010
| 
| 
|-
! scope="row" | 2011
| Logie Awards of 2011
| 
| 
|-
! scope="row" | 2012
| Logie Awards of 2012
| 
|

References

External links
Official Ready Steady Cook website
Ready Steady Cook at the National Film and Sound Archive

Australian cooking television series
Australian television series based on British television series
Network 10 original programming
Cooking competitions in Australia
2005 Australian television series debuts
2013 Australian television series endings
2000s Australian game shows
2010s Australian game shows
Television series by Endemol Australia
Television series by Endemol
English-language television shows